Corentin Urbain de Leissègues (Hanvec, 29 August 1758 – Paris, 26 March 1832) was a French admiral of the Napoleonic wars, notably the losing commander of the Battle of San Domingo.

Biography 
Leissègues joined the Navy in 1778, at age 20. He served on the frigate Oiseau and took part in patrol in the English Channel, before being transferred on the Nymphe. In 1780, he was promoted to 'lieutenant de frégate' and joined the Magicienne.

In 1781, Leissègues served under Suffren and took part in the campaigns of the Franco-Indian alliances. He received a wound at the head during the Battle of Providien.

From 1785, Leissègues served in the North Sea on the frigate Vigilante. Promoted to 'sous-lieutenant de vaisseau', he served in the Indian Ocean aboard the frigate Méduse from 1787 to 1791. He took his first command with the brig Furet, off Newfoundland.

Leissègues was promoted to Captain in early 1793 and put in command of a convoy bound for Windward Islands. Arriving at Guadeloupe, he found the island in British hands, and launched a 4-month campaign to re-take it. He was subsequently promoted to 'contre-amiral'.

Upon his return to France, Leissègues was put in charge of harbour inspection from Saint-Malo to Vlissingen. He was then given command of the harbours of Ostend, Vlissingen, and Antwerp, as well of the naval forces stationed near Walcheren.

Leissègues later led a naval division to Northern Africa to reduce attacks by Barbary corsairs. He managed to obtain assurances in Algiers and Tunis, bringing back presents and the ambassador of Tunis to Paris. The same years, he ferried General Brune to Constantinople.

In 1806, Leissègues led a five-ship squadron to reinforce Santo Domingo. A British squadron led by Vice-Admiral John Thomas Duckworth intercepted the convoy, and destroyed it in the ensuing Battle of San Domingo.

On 7 April 1809, Leissègues was put in charge of the defence of Venice. He was tasked to provide for Corfu, where he stayed until the surrender of the island to the Allies, in 1814, upon orders of Louis XVIII.

Leissègues returned to Toulon in August 1814. He served under the Bourbon Restoration until 1818, rising to vice-admiral.

Honours 
 Commander of the Order of Saint Louis
 Commander of the Legion of Honour

French Navy admirals
1758 births
1832 deaths
French naval commanders of the Napoleonic Wars
Commanders of the Order of Saint Louis
Commandeurs of the Légion d'honneur